The 1983–84 Serie C1 was the sixth edition of Serie C1, the third highest league in the Italian football league system.

Overview

Serie C1/A
It was contested by 18 teams, and Parma won the championship. It was decided that Parma, Bologna was promoted to Serie B, and Prato, Fano, Fanfulla, Trento was demoted in Serie C2.

Serie C1/B
It was contested by 18 teams, and Bari won the championship. It was decided that Bari, Taranto was promoted to Serie B, and Civitanovese, Siena, Foligno, Rende was demoted in Serie C2.

League standings

Serie C1/A

Serie C1/B

External links
Italy Championship 1983/84 at RSSSF

Serie C1 seasons
3
Italy